Minecraft Earth was an augmented reality and geolocation-based sandbox game developed by Mojang Studios and published by Xbox Game Studios. A spin-off of the video game Minecraft, it was first announced in May 2019, and was available on Android and iOS. The game was free-to-play, and was first released in early access on 17 October 2019. The game received its final update in January 2021 and officially shut down on 30 June 2021 due to the COVID-19 pandemic.

As well as being an augmented reality game, Minecraft Earth was also a location-based game due to its use of a GPS-tracked world map.

Gameplay
Similar to Minecraft, Minecraft Earth was centered around building structures, gathering resources, crafting, and exploration. The game utilized the same Bedrock game engine as other versions of Minecraft. In "build mode", players could build augmented reality structures on "Buildplates" in collaboration with other players, then explore them in full size with "play mode". In both Build mode and Play mode, the buildplates were overlaid onto the real world using augmented reality (AR) and the built-in phone camera. Players could gather resources by collecting "tappables" in the in-game map and by completing "adventures" which may be a puzzle, a specific task, or a virtual location with hostile entities to defeat. Minecraft Earth considers physical objects such as trees and lakes so there are fewer incidents and interferences with the AR simulation.

Minecraft Earth included many different kinds of in-game entities called "mobs" that are exclusive variations of the mobs in Minecraft. The game had two in-game currencies: "rubies" and "minecoins". Rubies could be earned through gameplay or purchased with real money and could be used to purchase items that affect gameplay such as "build plates". Minecoins, which are present in all Bedrock editions of Minecraft, could only be purchased with real money and are used to purchase cosmetic items, such as texture packs and character skins.

Development
Minecraft Earth utilized information from OpenStreetMap for map information and was built on Microsoft Azure for its augmented reality features. The game was free-to-play, and supported Android and iOS smartphones.

During Microsoft Build 2015, Microsoft's HoloLens team unveiled an augmented reality version of Minecraft. On 8 May 2019, a teaser trailer was released which showed a Muddy Pig. Minecraft Earth was announced during Minecraft 10th anniversary in May 2019. Microsoft created a website for players to signup for the closed beta that was released during mid-2019, and Microsoft intended to release the game in a gradual rollout. Multiplayer gameplay was showcased at the Apple Worldwide Developers Conference in June 2019.

Release
A closed beta was first released for iOS on 16 July 2019 in Seattle and London, then in Stockholm, Tokyo, and Mexico City over the next two days. Android users in these cities gained access to the closed beta on 30 August 2019.

Minecraft Earth was first released in early access in Iceland and New Zealand on 17 October 2019, and slowly rolled out in other countries in the following weeks, such as the United States in November. It was made available globally on 11 December 2019 (it was not available in China, Cuba, Iran, Myanmar, Sudan, Iraq, and UAE).

On 5 January 2021, developer Mojang Studios announced that they were releasing the final build of Minecraft Earth, citing the COVID-19 pandemic as a factor. Mojang added that they would be ending support for Minecraft Earth on 30 June 2021.

Reception
Newshub described the game as "hugely ambitious". Research firm Sensor Tower reported that it was downloaded 1.4 million times in its first week of release, with 1.2 million from the United States.

Awards
The game was nominated for "Best VR/AR Game" at the Game Critics Awards, and won the Coney Island Dreamland Award for Best AR/VR Game at the New York Game Awards. Time Magazine listed Minecraft Earth as one of the Best 100 Inventions of 2019.

Legacy
One of the game's songs, "Earth", was featured as downloadable content in Nintendo's 2018 crossover fighting game Super Smash Bros. Ultimate, with it being arranged by Mitsuhiro Kitadani. This new arrangement was added to the game on 13 October 2020, as part of Challenger Pack 7 within Super Smash Bros. Ultimates Fighters Pass Vol. 2 season pass. Challenger Pack 7 features content from the Minecraft franchise, including a playable Minecraft fighter whose playable color variations include the default Minecraft skins Steve and Alex, a stage based on various Minecraft biomes, and seven music tracks, including the "Earth" arrangement itself as well as six other tracks sourced from Minecraft Dungeons and various minigames from the discontinued Legacy Console Edition of Minecraft.

References

External links
 

2019 video games
Android (operating system) games
Augmented reality games
Construction and management simulation games
Delisted digital-only games
Early access video games
Free-to-play video games
Inactive online games
iOS games
Location-based games
Microsoft games
Minecraft
Open-world video games
Pervasive games
Products and services discontinued in 2021
Video games developed in Sweden